Keep It Goin' On is the second studio album by the American band Hi-Five. Released on August 11, 1992 by Jive Records, The lead single "She's Playing Hard to Get" peaked at number five on the Billboard Hot 100 and number two on the R&B singles chart. It is the second studio album featuring the teen frontman lead singer Tony Thompson who propelled this album into platinum status. It also features the first appearance of Bronx, New York native, Treston Irby.  These singles from their previous album, featuring Irby include: "I Can't Wait Another Minute", "I Like the Way (The Kissing Game)", and the remix version of "Just Another Girlfriend". Also, Keep It Goin' On is the final album to include the original members Roderick "Pooh" Clark (who was paralyzed from the chest down due to an accidental highway car crash shortly after the second album's release) and Russell Neal (who shortly left the group due to financial conflicts).

Background
"She's Playing Hard to Get" is the first single from this album. The single peaked at number five on the Billboard Hot 100 and number two on the R&B singles chart. The album is notable for featuring the first recorded appearance of singer Faith Evans, who made her debut as a background singer on the song "She Said".

Track listing

Personnel
Hi-Five
Tony Thompson – lead vocals, harmony, and backing vocals
Roderick Clark – harmony and backing vocals
Marcus Sanders – harmony and backing vocals
Treston Irby – harmony and backing vocals
Russell Neal – harmony and backing vocals

Additional singers
 R. Kelly –  programming, background vocals, producer
 Jose Fernandez  –  programming
 Ike Lee –  programming
 Timmy Allen –  instruments, producer
 Joshua Grau –  guitar
 Eric Foster White –  drum programming, bass, keyboards, recording engineer
 Kevin Johnson –  drums
 D-Nice –  additional drum programming
 Carl Bourelly –  keyboards, producer
 Jean-Paul Bourelly –  guitar
 Faith Evans –  background vocals
 Roz Davis –  background vocals
 Schon-Jomel Crawford –  background vocals
 Ed Calle –  trumpet
 Brett Murphey –  saxophone
 Lee Levin –  drums
 Little Anthony Carr –  background vocals
 Tony Thompson –  background vocals
 Thoudia Bickham –  background vocals
 Dawn Green –  background vocals
 Daymin Miley –  background vocals, songwriter 
 Peter Mokran –  mixing
 Chris Trevett –  mixing
 Pierre Ushay - drum programming, remix
 Anthony Saunders –  recording engineer
 Pete Christensen –  recording engineer
 Ben Garrison –  recording engineer, mixing
 Jim Munn –  recording engineer
 Kerry Craston –  recording engineer
 Tim Latham –  recording engineer
 Will Tartak –  recording engineer
 Tom Vercillo –  recording engineer
 Tom Coyne –  mastering
 June Ambrose –  styling
 Hula –  additional production, remix
 K. Fingers –  additional production, remix
 Gary Spector –  photography
 ZombArt JK –  design

Charts

Weekly charts

Year-end charts

Release history
 Keep It Goin' On (Jive)
 Greatest Hits (Jive)
 Club Mix '98, Vol. 2 (Cold Front Records / K-Tel Distribution)
 Kool Hits of 80's (Avex Trax)
 Let It Rock 1993 (Direct Source)
 Body and Soul: Smooth Jams (Time/Life Music)   
 I Like the Way (The Kissing Game) (Sony CMG)
 Pop Hits of the 90s (BMG Special Products)
 Pop Hits of the 90s [#2] (BMG Special Products)
 Pure Swing [Universal 2013] (Universal Music)

References

External links
 Keep It Goin' On – Hi-Five : Songs, Reviews, Credits, Awards : AllMusic

1992 albums
Hi-Five albums
Albums produced by R. Kelly
Jive Records albums